The Immediate Geographic Region of Frutal is one of the 4 immediate geographic regions in the Intermediate Geographic Region of Uberaba, one of the 70 immediate geographic regions in the Brazilian state of Minas Gerais and one of the 509 of Brazil, created by the National Institute of Geography and Statistics (IBGE) in 2017.

Municipalities 
It comprises 6 municipalities.

 Comendador Gomes     
 Fronteira  
 Frutal  
 Itapagipe
 Pirajuba  
 Planura

See also 

 List of Intermediate and Immediate Geographic Regions of Minas Gerais

References 

Geography of Minas Gerais